Salvatore "Torrie" Zito (October 12, 1933 – December 3, 2009) was an American pianist, music arranger, composer and conductor.

Life and career
He is most widely known for his hugely popular work with John Lennon on the classic album Imagine, as string arranger.

He wrote advertising jingles, including a famous one for Maxwell House, and background music for many television programs.

In 1964, he conducted and did the arrangements for singer Morgana King's classic album, Miss Morgana King. Those with a good ear might like to compare the voicing of the first few bars of Torrie's arrangement of the track "All Blues" with that of the first few bars of Symphony No. 11 by Dmitri Shostakovich. They are remarkably similar; a hint by Torrie that long sections of the symphony are inspiration for variations on All Blues. Helen Merrill confirms that Torrie was interested in the music of Shostakovich.

A New York City resident, Zito was married to singer Helen Merrill, with whom he recorded several albums. He had one daughter, Lisa Zito, from his first marriage, and a stepson, a singer-songwriter Alan Merrill (most known for his 1975 hit "I Love Rock'n'Roll"), by his second marriage (to Merrill). His brother is the drummer Ronnie Zito.

Death
Zito died from emphysema on December 3, 2009 at his Manhattan home.

See also
 List of jazz arrangers
 List of music arrangers

References

External links

Interview with Torrie Zito on JazzProfessional.com
[ Torrie Zito - All Music Guide entry]

1933 births
2009 deaths
Deaths from emphysema
American music arrangers
American male conductors (music)
20th-century American pianists
American male pianists
20th-century American conductors (music)
20th-century American male musicians